Sundaram-Clayton Limited (SCL) is an Indian automotive components company, based in Chennai and part of TVS Group. It makes aluminium and magnesium castings for the automotive industry. SCL was the flagship company of the TVS Group before being overtaken by its subsidiary TVS Motor Company.

SCL was founded in 1962 in collaboration with Clayton Dewandre Holdings plc, United Kingdom.

References 

Metal companies of India
Companies based in Chennai
1962 establishments in Madras State
Indian companies established in 1962
Companies listed on the National Stock Exchange of India
Companies listed on the Bombay Stock Exchange